E is an Indian Malayalam language  Supernatural horror film directed by Kukku Surendran starring Gautami Tadimalla in lead role. Produced by Sangeeth Sivan and Amin Surani, the story is written by Rohan Bajaj and Amin Surani. The screenplay has been penned down by Rohan Bajaj and Hari Kumar K. The film's title was announced in January 2016 and principal photography began on 26 March 2017 in Haripad, Kerala. Manoj Pillai handles the cinematography while Rahul Raj composes the original songs and background score. The film released theatrically in 18 August 2017.

Plot
Karthik (Ashiq Ameer), Aru (Meera Nair), Jenny (Kalyani Vidya) and Hari (Balaji Jayarajan) are four friends. Karthik plans on making a documentary on Alzheimer's and visits Alex (Dain Davis) for the same. All five of them go to Karthik's old teacher's tharavadu for the shooting. Karthik's teacher Malathi teacher (Gautami) and her daughter Athira (Nitya Naresh) live a traditional life with temple, music and yoga. Also Athira was Karthik's childhood sweetheart. Malathi teacher has Alzheimer's and is supported by Athira. But after some days of their arrival, they start facing paranormal activities and understand that Malathi teacher is possessed by a spirit named Bhargavan. Jenny receives a book from a box in which a symbol is present. Athira realizes that the symbol is present on the back of her neck and shows it to Karthik proving that she was the third girl who was to be sacrificed by Bhargavan for the process of immortality since the symbol will only be present on the third girl to be sacrificed meaning the first two girls were killed. Then they understand that Bhargavan was killed by Malathi teacher for hypnotizing Athira and trying to sacrifice her in her childhood. To remove Bhargavan's spirit from Malathi they had to find Bhargavan's bones and had to destroy it in fire before Pournami night which was the very same day. They find the bones with the help of Anna's (Elsamma's daughter) paintings. But Bhargavan(Malathi) hypnotizes Anna and brings her for the sacrifice. Before Anna gets killed Karthik burns his bones thus destroying Bhargavan's spirit. The film ends by showing Karthik, Aru, Jenny, Hari and Alex leaving when Malathi teacher asks about when they are going to come again to the tharavadu for the completing the shooting to which Aru replies that they will surely return looking at Karthik and Athira meaning that they have fallen in love.

Cast 
 Gautami as Malathi Menon
 Ashiq Ameer as Karthik
 Balaji Jayaraman as Hari
 Dain Davis as Alex
 Kalyani Vidya as Jenny
 Meera Nair P.S as Aru 
 Nithya Naresh as Athira
 Anjali Nair as Elsamma
 Sathyajith
 Kalesh
 Hari Kumar K as Mr. Menon

Production 
Sangeeth Sivan announced the film in early 2017, as a story was developed from a pitch given by his Bollywood writing collaborator Rohan Bajaj. He roped in his former assistant Kukku Surendran as the director, Hari Kumar K as screenwriter, Gautami as the lead actress and Rahul Raj as the composer. Subsequently, Manoj Pillai and Ayoob Khan were signed as the cinematographer and editor respectively.

The filming commenced in March 2017. The film will see several young actors making their debut in Malayalam cinema.

Soundtrack 
The film's original background score and songs are composed, arranged and produced by Rahul Raj.

The soundtrack release featured four original songs from the movie.
Tracklist
"Pranavaakaaram" - Saritha Ram
"Arupathu Maram" - Sunil Mathayi, Vaishakh Ch, Vipin Xavier and Aparna Rajeev
"Divaayaanam" - Rahul Raj
"Ellake Ellake" -

References

Films shot in Alappuzha
2017 films
Indian horror thriller films
2017 horror thriller films
Films scored by Rahul Raj
2010s Malayalam-language films
2017 horror films